Mount Young is a  mountain summit located west of the crest of the Sierra Nevada mountain range in Tulare County, California. The John Muir Trail traverses below the south and west aspects of the mountain, providing access. Mt. Young ranks as the 117th highest summit in California.

History
In 1881, Rev. Frederick H. Wales of Tulare climbed Mount Young, where he left a record of its name, and the name of the peak south of it, for which he suggested the name "Mount Hitchcock." Wales Lake, one mile to the northeast of Mt. Young, was named after him. This mountain's name was officially adopted in 1909 by the U.S. Board on Geographic Names to honor the eminent American astronomer Charles Augustus Young (1834–1908). Young was teaching at Dartmouth College while Wales was a Dartmouth student (1872 graduate). The first ascent of the summit was made September 7, 1881, by Frederick H. Wales, William B. Wallace, and Captain James Wright. During the same month, Wales also made the first ascent of Mount Hitchcock and Mount Kaweah.

Climate
According to the Köppen climate classification system, Mount Young has an alpine climate. Most weather fronts originate in the Pacific Ocean, and travel east toward the Sierra Nevada mountains. As fronts approach, they are forced upward by the peaks, causing them to drop their moisture in the form of rain or snowfall onto the range (orographic lift). Precipitation runoff from this mountain drains west to the Kern River via Wallace and Whitney Creeks.

See also

 List of mountain peaks of California

References

External links
 Weather forecast: Mount Young

Mountains of Tulare County, California
Mountains of Sequoia National Park
North American 4000 m summits
Mountains of Northern California
Sierra Nevada (United States)